Barbara Mirosława Wolnicka-Szewczyk (born 21 March 1970) is a Polish fencer. She won a silver medal in the women's team foil event at the 2000 Summer Olympics.

References

External links
 

1970 births
Living people
Polish female fencers
Polish foil fencers
Olympic fencers of Poland
Fencers at the 1992 Summer Olympics
Fencers at the 1996 Summer Olympics
Fencers at the 2000 Summer Olympics
Olympic silver medalists for Poland
Olympic medalists in fencing
Sportspeople from Katowice
Medalists at the 2000 Summer Olympics
20th-century Polish women
21st-century Polish women